Senator McCarthy can refer to:

Members of the United States Senate
Joseph McCarthy (1908–1957), U.S. Senator from Wisconsin from 1947 to 1957
Eugene McCarthy (1916–2005), U.S. Senator from Minnesota from 1959 to 1971

Members of the United States House of Representatives
Kevin McCarthy (U.S. House Minority Leader born 1965)

United States state senate members
Charles F. McCarthy (1876–?), Massachusetts State Senate
Daniel M. McCarthy (1888–1950), Kansas State Senate
Dennis McCarthy (congressman) (1814–1886), New York State Senate
John F. McCarthy (1924–1981), California State Senate
Robert E. McCarthy (born 1949), Massachusetts State Senate
Robert W. McCarthy (1924–2015), Illinois State Senate

See also
Senator McCarty (disambiguation)